The 2016 Matador BBQs One-Day Cup was the 47th season of the official List A domestic cricket competition in Australia. It was played over a three-week period at the start of the domestic season to separate its schedule from the Sheffield Shield season. The tournament was held in Sydney, Brisbane and Perth, with 13 of the 23 matches broadcast live on free-to-air television on 9Gem. In the final, New South Wales, who qualified for the final through a victory in an elimination final against Victoria, were successful over Queensland, who won every round robin game except for one.

Points table

RESULT POINTS:

 Win – 4
 Tie – 2 each
 No Result – 2 each
 Loss – 0
 Bonus Point – 1 (Run rate 1.25 times that of opposition.)
 Additional Bonus Point – 1 (Run rate twice that of opposition.)

Fixtures

Elimination Final

Final

Statistics

Most Runs

Most wickets

References

External links
 Matador BBQs One-Day Cup 2016/17 on Cricket.com.au
 Tournament home at ESPN Cricinfo

Matador BBQs One-Day Cup
Australian domestic limited-overs cricket tournament seasons
Matador BBQs One-Day Cup